The 1920 Victorian state election was held on 21 October 1920.

Retiring Members

Nationalist
Norman Bayles MLA (Toorak)
Malcolm McKenzie MLA (Upper Goulburn)
Agar Wynne MLA (St Kilda)

Legislative Assembly
Sitting members are shown in bold text. Successful candidates are highlighted in the relevant colour. Where there is possible confusion, an asterisk (*) is also used.

See also
1919 Victorian Legislative Council election

References

Psephos - Adam Carr's Election Archive

Victoria
Candidates for Victorian state elections